Eagris subalbida, commonly known as the chocolate flat, is a species of butterfly in the family Hesperiidae. It is found in Guinea, Ivory Coast, Ghana, Nigeria, Cameroon, Gabon, the Republic of the Congo, the Central African Republic, Uganda and Rwanda. The habitat consists of forests.

Adult males are known to feed from flowers and bird droppings.

Subspecies
Eagris subalbida subalbida - Guinea, Ivory Coast, Ghana, eastern Nigeria, Cameroon
Eagris subalbida aurivillii (Neustetter, 1927) - Gabon, Congo, Central African Republic, Uganda, Rwanda

References

Butterflies described in 1893
Tagiadini
Butterflies of Africa